Mężenin  is a village in the administrative district of Gmina Platerów, within Łosice County, Masovian Voivodeship, in east-central Poland.

The village has a population of 228.

References

Villages in Łosice County